Cliffe Park railway station was opened by the North Staffordshire Railway (NSR) in 1905 on the Churnet Valley line to attract visitors to Rudyard Lake (actually a reservoir), which the NSR were trying to develop as a leisure and tourist attraction including a golf course.  The station was originally named Rudyard Lake and was at the northern end of the lake.  There were no settlements nearby and consequently the station had no goods facilities.  There was one siding but this was used more for stabling excursion trains rather than freight vehicles.

In 1926 the London, Midland and Scottish Railway renamed the station Cliffe Park and at the same time , the next station to the south, was renamed Rudyard Lake. Cliffe Park was the name of the hall that had previously been the clubhouse of the golf course and stood on the opposite side of the lake from the station.

The station remained open until passenger services were withdrawn from the northern end of the Churnet valley line ( – ) in 1960.

Route

References
Notes

Source

Disused railway stations in Staffordshire
Railway stations in Great Britain closed in 1960
Railway stations in Great Britain opened in 1905
Former North Staffordshire Railway stations